Jung Eun-bi (born May 30, 1997), better known by her stage name Eunha, is a South Korean singer and actress. She was the vocalist of the girl group GFriend, and a current member of the trio Viviz.

Early life 
Eunha was born May 30, 1997, in Seoul. She was a child actress, and had a role in the 2007 television drama The Clinic for Married Couples: Love and War. 
When she was seven years old, she was diagnosed with langerhans cell histiocytosis (LCH). She then took on treatment for the disease and had regular blood tests until she was in the sixth grade of primary school. It was successfully cured and it was said that there is no possibility of recurrence.

Career
Eunha debuted as a member of South Korean girl group GFriend in early 2015 with the song "Glass Bead". She was featured on Pro C's single "Han River at Night", released on October 21, 2015. Eunha's first solo release was the song "Don't Come to Farewell", recorded for the soundtrack of the television drama Six Flying Dragons. It was released on March 7, 2016.

She played a role in MBC MBig TV's web show Oh My God! Tip with Block B's Park Kyung. Eunha was then featured on Park Kyung's single "Inferiority Complex", released May 25, 2016.

Her second solo release was the song "Love-ing", recorded for the soundtrack of the television drama Temperature of Love. It was released on October 2, 2017.

On October 6, 2021, it was announced that Eunha, along with former GFriend members SinB and Umji, have signed a contract with BPM Entertainment to debut as a trio. On October 8, 2021, it was announced their new group name would be Viviz.  Viviz debuted on February 9, 2022, with the extended play Beam of Prism.

Discography

Singles

Soundtrack appearances

Composition credits
All song credits are adapted from the Korea Music Copyright Association's database unless stated otherwise.

Filmography

Television series

Web show

Radio shows

Hosting

Awards and nominations

Notes

References

External links 

 

Living people
1997 births
Singers from Seoul
School of Performing Arts Seoul alumni
GFriend members
Viviz members
K-pop singers
South Korean women pop singers
South Korean female idols
21st-century South Korean singers
21st-century South Korean women singers
21st-century South Korean actresses
Hybe Corporation artists
BPM Entertainment artists